Dendrotriton sanctibarbarus is a species of salamander in the family Plethodontidae.
It is endemic to Honduras and was first described in 1996.

Its natural habitat is subtropical or tropical moist montane forests.
It is threatened by habitat loss.

References

Dendrotriton
Amphibians of Honduras
Endemic fauna of Honduras
Amphibians described in 1996
Taxonomy articles created by Polbot